"Walk On the Water" is the second single from Christian pop artist Britt Nicole's third album The Lost Get Found. A ballad pop song, "Walk On the Water" was released in November 2009 to radio. It peaked at No. 1 on Christian radio and No. 17 on Billboard's Hot Christian Songs chart.

Background
The song was written by Britt Nicole, Dan Muckala and Joshua Crosby.

Chart performance
For the week ending January 16, 2010, "Walk On the Water" peaked at No. 17 on Billboard's Hot Christian Songs chart. It stayed on the chart for 23 weeks. The song was also No. 1 on Radio and Records Christian CHR Chart.

Track listings
 Digital download
 "Walk On the Water" — 3:50

Other appearances
"Walk on the Water" was featured on the album. WOW Hits 2011. She also recorded an acoustic version of the song for her 2010 extended play Acoustic.

References

2009 singles
Britt Nicole songs
Songs written by Dan Muckala
2009 songs
Sparrow Records singles